Boreolestes is a genus of predatory air-breathing land slugs, shell-less pulmonate gastropod mollusks in the family Trigonochlamydidae.

The generic name Boreolestes contains the suffix -lestes, that means "robber".

Species
There are two species within the genus Boreolestes and they include:
 Boreolestes likharevi Schileyko & Kijashko, 1999 - type species
 Boreolestes sylvestris Kijashko in Schileyko & Kijashko, 1999

References

Trigonochlamydidae